Tirugubatu is a 1985 Indian Telugu language drama film directed by Dasari Narayana Rao. The film was produced by Vadde Sobhanadri and Vadde Ramesh under Vijaya Madhavi Arts banner. The film stars Krishnam Raju, Jayasudha, Mohan Babu and Vijayashanti in the lead roles. The music was composed by J. V. Raghavulu.

Cast
Krishnam Raju
Jayasudha
Mohan Babu
Vijayashanti
Sumalatha
Prabhakar Reddy
Jaggayya
Allu Ramalingaiah
Nutan Prasad

Soundtrack

References

1985 films
1980s Telugu-language films
Indian drama films
Films about revolutions
Films directed by Dasari Narayana Rao
Films scored by J. V. Raghavulu
1985 drama films